The Nationalist Canarian Assembly (ACAN) was a nationalist political party in the Canary Islands founded in 1987, as a coalition of Canarian Assembly and Canarian Nationalist Left.

History
ACAN was founded in 1987, being originally a coalition of Canarian Assembly (AC) and Canarian Nationalist Left (INC). In 1989 the two parties fully merged and ACAN became a political party.

In 1991 ACAN merged with the Canarian United Left and the Left Nationalists Union to form a new political party, Nationalist Canarian Initiative.

See also
 Canarian nationalism
 Canarian Coalition
 Canarian People's Union

References

Defunct nationalist parties in Spain
Defunct socialist parties in Spain
Political parties in the Canary Islands
Political parties established in 1989
Canarian nationalist parties
Left-wing nationalist parties
1987 establishments in Spain